The 6th General Logistic Support Regiment is a military logistics regiment of the Italian Army based in Budrio in the Emilia Romagna. The regiment is operationally assigned to the Logistic Support Command and manages the transport of equipment, personnel, and materiel from the logistic transit areas to military units in operations. The 6th regiment, together with the Transit Areas Management Regiment provides third line logistic support for the army's brigades and Rapid Deployable Corps – Italy.

History

World War II 

The history of the regiment begins with the support units of the 20th Infantry Division "Friuli". In April 1941 the division participated in the Invasion of Yugoslavia. After the Allied landings in French North Africa Italy and Germany occupied Vichy France on 11 November 1942 and the Friuli was ferried from Tuscany to northern Corsica, where the division remained on occupation duty until the announcement of the Armistice of Cassibile on 8 September 1943. In following days Italian forces and French partisans on Corsica fought the German Sturmbrigade Reichführer-SS, 90th Panzergrenadier Division, and Italian XII Paratroopers Battalion of the 184th Paratroopers Regiment "Nembo", which had crossed over from Sardinia and retreated through Corsica towards the harbor of Bastia in the island's north.

Now part of the Italian Co-belligerent Army the Friuli was transferred in July 1944 to San Giorgio del Sannio in southern Italy. On 20 September 1944 the division was reorganized as Combat Group "Friuli" and equipped with British weapons and materiel. The group entered combat on 5 February 1945 as replacement for the Polish 5th Infantry Division "Kresowa" of the II Polish Corps on the Senio river near Brisighella. From there the Friuli advanced with the allied armies to liberate Imola, Castel San Pietro and Bologna.

Cold War 

On 15 October 1945 the Combat Group "Friuli" was renamed Infantry Division "Friuli". Initially the division was based in the city of Bolzano, but in 1949 the division moved to Florence. On 15 April 1960, the division was reduced to Infantry Brigade "Friuli". The brigade was supported by the Supply, Repairs, Recovery Unit "Friuli" based in Coverciano in Florence.

During the 1975 army reform the army disbanded the regimental level and newly independent battalions were granted for the first time their own flags. On 23 September 1975 the Supply, Repairs, Recovery Unit "Friuli" and the Transport Unit "Friuli" in Coverciano were merged to form the new Logistic Battalion "Friuli". On 12 November 1976 the President of the Italian Republic Giovanni Leone issued decree 846, which granted the new units their flags.

Recent times 
After the end of the Cold War and the subsequent reduction of the Italian Army the Motorized Brigade "Friuli" merged with the Mechanized Brigade "Trieste" on 1 June 1991. On the same date the Logistic Battalion "Trieste" in Budrio was renamed Logistic Battalion "Friuli" and the flag of the Logistic Battalion "Trieste" was transferred to the Shrine of the Flags in the Vittoriano in Rome.

On 27 June 2001 the battalion was reorganized as 6th Transport Regiment and was transferred to the Logistic Projection Brigade. On 1 January 2015 the 6th Transport Regiment was renamed Logistic Regiment "Friuli" and assigned to the Airmobile Brigade "Friuli". Already one year later on 1 January 2016 the regiment left the brigade again and was assigned to the army's Logistic Support Command and reorganized as 6th General Logistic Support Regiment.

Current structure 
As of 2022 the 6th General Logistic Support Regiment consists of:

  Regimental Command, in Budrio
 Command and Logistic Support Company
 Transport Battalion
 Movement Control Battalion

The Command and Logistic Support Company fields the following platoons: C3 Platoon, Transport and Materiel Platoon, Medical Platoon, and Commissariat Platoon.

See also 
 Military logistics

External links
Italian Army Website: 6° Reggimento Logistico di Supporto Generale

References 

Logistic Regiments of Italy